Events from the year 1116 in Ireland.

Incumbents
High King of Ireland: Domnall Ua Lochlainn

Events

Births
Ruaidrí Ua Conchobair (Modern Irish: Ruaidhrí Ó Conchobhair, or, Ruairí Ó Conchúir; commonly anglicised as Rory O'Conor) (d. 1198) was King of Connacht from 1156 to 1186, and High King of Ireland from 1166 to 1183.[1] He was the last High King of Ireland before the Norman invasion of Ireland (Brian Ua Néill and Edward Bruce both claimed the title with opposition in later years).

References